Belinda Bencic was the defending champion, but withdrew with a left wrist injury before the tournament began.

Simona Halep won the title, defeating Madison Keys in the final, 7–6(7–2), 6–3.

Seeds
The top eight seeds received a bye into the second round.

Draw

Finals

Top half

Section 1

Section 2

Bottom half

Section 3

Section 4

Qualifying

Seeds

Qualifiers

Lucky losers

Qualifying draw

First qualifier

Second qualifier

Third qualifier

Fourth qualifier

Fifth qualifier

Sixth qualifier

Seventh qualifier

Eighth qualifier

Ninth qualifier

Tenth qualifier

Eleventh qualifier

Twelfth qualifier

References
Main Draw
Qualifying Draw

Rogers Cup - Women's Singles
Rogers Cup
Women's Singles
Rogers